{{about|the silent film|the Pee-wee's Playhouse episode|List of Pee-wee's Playhouse episodes#Season 5: 1990}}Something to Do'' is a lost 1919 American silent comedy film directed by Donald Crisp and written by Maximilian Foster and Will M. Ritchey. The film stars Bryant Washburn, Ann Little, Robert Brower, Charles K. Gerrard, Adele Farrington, and Charles Ogle. The film was released on April 13, 1919, by Paramount Pictures.

Plot
As described in a film magazine, Jack Merrill (Washburn), wealthy apostle of idleness, is advised by his physician to "find something to do" if he want to live long. His valet, posing as Lord Sidney, seeks to win the hand and fortune of newly rich Mrs. Parkin (Farrington), who has had her relative Peter Remwick (Brower) declared insane and confined to an asylum. Janet Remwick, his daughter, is permitted to stay on as secretary. Merrill learns of his valet's exploits and Janet's predicament, and masquerades as a nobleman to gain entry into the house. Peter Remwick escapes and returns to the house followed by his captors. Jack is instrumental in establishing Peter's sanity, proving Mrs. Parkin a crook, and winning Janet.

Cast
Bryant Washburn as	Jack Merrill
Ann Little as Janet Remwick
Robert Brower as Mr. Remwick
Charles K. Gerrard as Thompson 
Adele Farrington as Mrs. Parkin
Charles Ogle as Professor Frank Blight
James "Jim" Mason as Jose

References

External links

1919 films
1910s English-language films
Silent American comedy films
1919 comedy films
Paramount Pictures films
Films directed by Donald Crisp
American black-and-white films
Lost American films
American silent feature films
1919 lost films
Lost comedy films
1910s American films